Riverside is an unincorporated community in New Castle County, Delaware, United States. Riverside is located at the intersection of U.S. Route 13 Business and Harvey Road, southwest of Claymont.

References 

Unincorporated communities in New Castle County, Delaware
Unincorporated communities in Delaware